Castro Alves, Bahia is a municipality in the state of Bahia in the North-East region of Brazil. It was known as Vila de Nossa Senhora da Conceição de Curralinho, but it was rechristened Castro Alves in order to honor the poet who was born there.

See also
List of municipalities in Bahia

References

Municipalities in Bahia